Emil Claus Gotschlich (January 17, 1935 – February 14, 2023) was an American chemist who was professor emeritus at the Rockefeller University. He was best known for his development of the first meningitis vaccine in 1970.

Gotschlich received his M.D. from the New York University School of Medicine in 1959. He interned at Bellevue Hospital in New York before joining The Rockefeller University's Laboratory of Bacteriology and Immunology in 1960. He was promoted to professor and senior physician at The Rockefeller University Hospital in 1978. From 1996 to 2005 he served as the hospital's vice president for medical sciences. He was a member of the National Academy of Sciences and its Institute of Medicine. He was the recipient of the 1978 Albert Lasker Clinical Medical Research Award and the 2008 Dart/NYU Biotechnology Achievement Award.

Gotschlich died on February 14, 2023, at the age of 88.

References 

1935 births
2023 deaths
New York University Grossman School of Medicine alumni
Recipients of the Lasker-DeBakey Clinical Medical Research Award
Members of the United States National Academy of Sciences
Members of the National Academy of Medicine